Zori, also rendered as zōri, are thonged Japanese sandals made of rice straw, cloth, lacquered wood, leather, rubber, or—most commonly and informally—synthetic materials. They are a slip-on descendant of the tied-on  sandal.

Similar in form, modern flip-flops became popular in the United States, Australia and New Zealand when soldiers returning from World War II brought Japanese zori with them.

Use
Like many Japanese sandals, zori are easily slipped on and off, which is important in Japan, where shoes are removed and put back on when entering and leaving a house, and where tying shoelaces would be impractical when wearing traditional clothing.

The traditional forms of zori are seen when worn with other traditional clothing. Modern forms are fairly common, however, with casual Western wear, especially in summer. While geta are now mostly worn with the informal , traditional zori are often worn with the more formal kimono.

In rain, zori may be worn with toe covers ( zori).

Materials

In the Edo period (1603-1867), the production of zori became professionalized, and a variety of fancy types of zori emerged, using fancier materials. While zori were still commonly woven of rice straw (literally "straw zori"), rushes of various kinds and bamboo sheath were also used. If they were made of something less cheap than rice straw, an extra outsole was often sewn on. This could be made of coiled hemp rope, wistaria stems,, or wood in lateral strips ( or ). Modernly, polyurethane and cork are used as outsoles.

Zori also have a variety of upper surfaces. If they are woven on the same four-warp pattern, but using a weft of bamboo sheath (peelings of bamboo culms), they are  zori, literally bamboo-skin zori. The topsole may also be woven of common rush.

Raffia, rattan, and paper strips (treated and twisted to resemble rush) are also used in topsoles. Some soles are skiamorphic moldings that look like woven topsoles. Topsoles might also be made of cloth, leather, vinyl cloth, or EVA foam. Soles made entirely of waterproof (usually synthetic) materials are called  zori, literally rain-soled zori. Elastomer zori are called .

Wrapping straw straps with cloth makes the zori into  (cloth zori) Modern zori are usually made with the straps as a separate piece, not woven at the same time as the sole.

, like zori soles, are traditionally symmetrical, with no difference between left and right, though some designs diverge from this.

The  of informal zori can be made of a velour-like material, as is often the case for  zori. The  of more formal colored vinyl zori are either vinyl or fabric straps. Men's zori may also feature leather or leather imitation .

Traditionally,  are adjusted to the wearer, being tied through three holes by strings attached to the straps.  can wear and stretch easily; in such instances, the  can be adjusted or replaced through small flaps in the soles, which conceal the knots that hold them in place. In other instances, however, the  can be entirely inaccessible, requiring the glued sole to be split open, or entire shoe to be replaced.

Varieties and formalities

Both the gender of the wearer and the formality of the occasion affects the choice of zori. Regardless of variety, zori are almost always worn with  socks.

Women's zori are seldom flat, save for  zori. The soles come in different thicknesses and angles, and are typically covered by vinyl or fabric, though some modern varieties feature a hard black plastic sole with a non-slip base. In contrast, men's zori almost always feature a flat sole.

Zori with a woven wicker covering are referred to as   zori are generally considered to be relatively formal zori, even if the covering is a vinyl imitation of a woven bamboo-sheath cover. Though most zori with a  cover are considered to be menswear - known as  - traditional women's footwear with a  cover also exist, though these are generally confined to the  variety of geta. In contrast,  zori are more modern, and are not worn with kimono, but are considered working wear or are sometimes matched with casual Western or Japanese clothing. These zori more closely resemble a flat sandal with a woven base.

Setta were historically mostly , but , they were often ; they were also increasingly likely to have coloured and patterned straps.

Vinyl or plastic zori are next in formality. They are worn with formal clothing such as a semi-formal kimono. The most formal variety of zori are generally worn by women; they are brocade covered zori that are used with the most formal of kimono, such as wedding and funeral wear.

The , or thongs, may be white or black, depending on the occasion; white  are worn with formal zori, with black  considered to be informal. They may also complement the colour of the garment. Black, white, and red  are traditional and commonly mass-produced, but colourful  with a variety of patterns, sometimes chosen separately from the zori, are also popular.

See also
 Geta, traditional Japanese wooden sandals
 , traditional Japanese wooden clogs
 , traditional Japanese split-toed socks
 , traditional Japanese split-toed boots
 , a simpler form of traditional Japanese sandal
 , a zori that comes to life when possessed by a

Notes

References

External links

Sandals
Japanese footwear
Straw objects
Weaving